The All-American Boys Chorus started as a small church choir in Orange County, California in 1970 and has grown into a 501(c)(3) non-profit, internationally-touring, non-denominational chorus that fosters creativity and leadership development in over one hundred boys each year.

About
Based in Santa Ana, California, the Chorus is under the artistic direction of Wesley Martin. The Chorus attracts youth from 26 cities throughout Southern California, from diverse cultural and religious backgrounds and economic status. Programs require a small tuition payment; however, no child is turned away based on need.

The Chorus's program progresses through different stages of cognitive development, transforming an individual from a beginner vocalist to a seasoned performer while instilling leadership skills through peer-to-peer mentoring. All choristers participate in after-school and weekend music lessons with rehearsals at the Santa Ana campus, as well as performances, recordings, national and international concert tours, and an annual week-long summer camp.

Most choristers remain in the program for approximately four years, with some students continuing by joining the graduate chorus or as part-time staff or interns. All Saturday four-hour rehearsals combine periods of time for breaks, recreation, games, music education, and vocal learning.

History
For over 40 years, the group worked out of rented space at the Orange County Fairgrounds.

 In 2015, the Chorus appeared on the David Benoit Trio's Believe holiday jazz album.
 In 2016, the group collaborated with a capella group Vocal Point on a cover of the track Go the Distance from Disney’s Hercules.
 On August 10, 2018 Roger Giese, a vocal coach at the Chorus in 1998 was extradited from the UK to California, where he had been living incognito for nearly twenty years.
 On November 10, 2018 the Chorus performed at the lighting of the World’s Tallest Live-Cut Tree' (110 ft.) in Phoenix, Arizona with Caleb Lee Hutchinson and American Idol's Maddie Poppe.

Discography
 A Little Christmas Magic (1985)
 On the Sunny Side of the Street (1988)
 The Best Gift of All (1992)
 By Request (1996)
 On Tour! (2003)
 California Dreamin' (2016)

References

External links
 
 All-American Boys Chorus Video

Choirs of children
Choirs in California
1970 establishments in California